Museum of Arts or in French Musée des Arts is a museum dedicated to the arts. It may refer to:

Museum of Arts
Museum of Arts and Design, New York
Dallas Museum of Art
Saint Louis Art Museum

Musée des Arts
Musée des Arts Forains, Paris
Musée des Arts et Métiers, Paris

See also
 Museum of Fine Arts (disambiguation)
 Museum of Decorative Arts (disambiguation)